HackBB was a Tor hidden service Internet forum specializing in buying stolen credit cards, skimming ATMs, and hacking computers, servers and accounts. The site was often a destination for hacked and stolen data dumps. At some point the site was hosted by Tor hosting company Freedom Hosting.

The site was founded by 'OptimusCrime' in the earlier days of Tor. In June 2012, user 'Boneless' was promoted to an administrator role, who went on to handle site escrow. However, in March 2013 Boneless's account was used to destroy the site's database, and again in May by some accounts he secretly created. The site initially recovered from this, but shut down sometime afterwards due to the loss of faith in the site's administration and the raid on its host Freedom Hosting in August 2013.

References 

Internet forums
Defunct Tor hidden services
Crime forums
Hacker groups
Carding (fraud)